Frank West (September 26, 1850 – August 26, 1923) was a United States Army colonel who was a recipient of the Medal of Honor for actions in fighting Indians at the Battle of Big Dry Wash, Arizona. West is an 1872 graduate of West Point.

Early life and the western frontier
West served in the 6th Cavalry Regiment on the western frontier. He was awarded the Medal of Honor for rallying his men against a fortified position at Big Dry Wash, Arizona. Three other men, Second Lieutenant George H. Morgan, Second Lieutenant Thomas Cruse and First Sergeant Charles Taylor were also awarded Medals of Honor in this action. Morgan and Cruse are also Academy graduates. West became Colonel of the 2nd Cavalry Regiment in October 1906, and was retired on his 64th birthday in 1914.

His wife was Rebecca Kenyon (1851–1912).

Medal of Honor citation
West was awarded the Medal of Honor in 1892 for action at Big Dry Wash, Arizona, on 17 July 1882.

Citation:
"Rallied his command and led it in the advance against the enemy's fortified position."

References

External links

 

1850 births
1923 deaths
People from Herkimer County, New York
Military personnel from New York (state)
United States Army Medal of Honor recipients
Burials at Arlington National Cemetery
United States Military Academy alumni
American Indian Wars recipients of the Medal of Honor